GUlbarga University is a public university located in Kalaburagi, Karnataka, India. The university is recognized by University Grants Commission and accredited by National Assessment and Accreditation Council (NAAC). In 2016, Gulbarga university was awarded 'B' grade by NAAC.

History
Gulbarga University was established in 1980 by an Act of Karnataka State. Earlier it was a post-graduate centre of Karnatak University, Dharwad.

Academics
The main campus of Gulbarga University is spread over 860 acres and situated 6 Kilometre east of Kalaburagi city. The university has more than 45 post-graduate and post-graduate diploma programmes at 37 study centres.

References

External links
 Official website

Universities in Karnataka
Education in Kalaburagi
Universities and colleges in Kalaburagi district
Educational institutions established in 1980
1980 establishments in Karnataka
Companies based in Kalaburagi
Organisations based in Kalaburagi